This is a list of Kent County Cricket Club first-class cricket records; that is, record team and individual performances in first-class cricket for Kent County Cricket Club.

As of March 2021, Kent have played over 3,000 first-class matches since the official formation of the club in 1842. Over 2,800 of these have been in the County Championship which Kent have been a member of since its inaugural season in 1890. Before August 1842 the county was represented by a number of first-class teams who competed against county sides and other representative teams.

Team records 
All records last updated 4 July 2017

Kent's highest score in an innings was achieved in 1934 against Essex at Brentwood. Their highest score at a home ground was set in 2017 at Beckenham with Northamptonshire as the opposition. This surpassed the score of 633/8 made in 2015 at Tunbridge Wells against Essex. The county's lowest innings totals all date from the 19th century.

 Highest total against in an innings: 676 by Australians at Canterbury, 1921
 Lowest total against in an innings: 16 by Warwickshire at Tonbridge, 1913

Highest partnerships 
The highest partnership in Kent's history was 423 runs scored by Jordan Cox and Jack Leaning, set in 2020 at Canterbury against Sussex. This surpassed the previous highest partnership of 382 runs set in 2017. Cox and Leaning's partnership was unbroken when Kent were forced to declare their innings after 120 overs.

The stand of 235 achieved by Woolley and Fielder in 1909 remains, as of 2021, a record for the 10th wicket in County cricket.

Appearances 
Five men have made more than 500 appearances for Kent in first-class cricket.

764 Frank Woolley, 1906−1938
606 Wally Hardinge, 1902−1933
536 James Seymour, 1902−1926
520 Derek Underwood, 1963−1987
506 Tich Freeman, 1914−1936

Individual batting records 
Frank Woolley holds the records for most runs scored for Kent as well as most runs in a season and most centuries in a career with 122, the only player with more than 100 centuries for the county. He made 10 centuries for the county in both the 1928 and 1934 seasons.  Arthur Fagg scored two double centuries in a match against Essex at Colchester in 1938, a feat unique in first-class cricket until February 2019.

The highest individual score for the county is 332 runs, achieved by Bill Ashdown against Essex at Brentwood in 1934. Ashdown is one of only two men to have scored more than 300 runs in an innings for the county, doing so twice in his career. Sean Dickson is the only other triple-centurion for Kent, scoring 318 runs against Northamptonshire in 2017. Dickson's innings, which formed part of a new record partnership for any wicket for Kent with Joe Denly, was Kent's highest score since the Second World War.

Individual bowling records 
Spin bowlers Tich Freeman and Colin Blythe dominate Kent bowling records. Freeman is the leading wicket taker in Kent's history and holds the records for the most 5-for and 10-for innings in first-class cricket. Blythe has the best known figures in an innings for the county, taking 10/30 against Northamptonshire in 1907.

Freeman took 10 wickets in a match for Kent 128 times with Blythe achieving the same feat 64 times. Doug Wright took six first-class hat-tricks for the county during his career as well as one for MCC in 1938/39. His seven hat-tricks is a world best total in first-class cricket. Dean Headley took three hat-tricks in the 1996 season for Kent, equalling the world best. Joseph Wells became the first recorded bowler to take four wickets in four balls for any team when playing for Kent against Sussex in 1862.

Note: The most wickets taken in a season for Kent by a bowler other than Freeman is 185, by Colin Blythe in 1909. Freeman (14 times), Blythe (8 times), Arthur Fielder (twice) and Frank Woolley (once) are the only men to take 150 wickets or more in a season for Kent.

Edmund Hinkly took ten wickets in an innings against England at Lord's in 1848, the first time that the feat of taking all ten wickets in a first-class innings is known to have been achieved in first-class cricket. It is not known how many runs he conceded in doing so. These are the only occasions on which a Kent bowler has taken all 10 wickets in an innings.

Hinkly took 16 wickets in the match against England in 1848 but, again, it is not known how many runs he conceded.

As of November 2017, only three players have taken a wicket for Kent with their first ball in first-class cricket for the county: George McCanlis in 1873, Colin Blythe in 1899 and Gerald Hough in 1919. Hough's wicket was the only one he took in his first-class career.

Fielding records 
Frank Woolley holds the Kent record for the most catches by a non-wicket-keeper with 773 taken during his long career with the county. James Seymour is the only other man to take more than 500 catches with 659. Chris Tavaré holds the record for the most catches in a season for Kent with 48 taken in 1978. Seymour took 40 or more catches for the county six times during his career.

 Most catches in an innings: 6 James Seymour vs South Africans at Canterbury, 1904 and Stuart Leary vs Cambridge University at Fenner's, 1958
 Most catches in a match: 8 John Prodger vs Gloucestershire at College Ground, Cheltenham, 1961
 Most catches in a season: 48 Chris Tavaré, 1978
 Most catches in a career: 773 Frank Woolley, 1906–1938

Wicketkeeping records 
Kent are known for having produced a line of top-class wicketkeepers. The long-serving Fred Huish, who played for the county between 1895 and 1914, holds the record for the most career dismissals for the county. Huish's nine stumpings in one match in 1911 are a world record, and prior to the 2022 season he and Jack Hubble held the club record for the most dismissals in a match with 10. This was beaten by Sam Billings who took 12 dismissals, setting a new record for the most dismissals in a County Championship match in the process.
 Most dismissals in an innings: 8 Steve Marsh vs Middlesex at Lord's, 1991 (8 catches, no stumpings)
 Most dismissals in a match: 12 Sam Billings vs Warwickshire at Edgbaston, 2022 (12 catches, no stumpings)
 Most catches in a season: 78 Alan Knott, 1967
 Most stumpings in a season: 56 Les Ames, 1932
 Most total dismissals in a season: 116 Les Ames, 1929
 Most catches in a career: 901 Fred Huish, 1895–1914
 Most stumpings in a career: 352 Fred Huish, 1895–1914
 Most total dismissals in a career: 1,253 Fred Huish, 1895–1914

See also 
List of Kent County Cricket Club List A cricket records
List of Kent County Cricket Club Twenty20 cricket records

Notes

References

External links
 Kent County Cricket Club website

Lists of English cricket records and statistics
Cricket in Kent
Cricket